Lago di Vagli is a lake in the Province of Lucca, Tuscany, Italy. It was created in 1953 after the construction of a dam. It houses a depopulated village, the Fabbriche di Careggine, which becomes reachable when the basin is emptied for maintenance. The population was transferred in new residences built in the nearby Vagli Sotto.

Vagli